The following lists events that happened during 1992 in Armenia.

Incumbents
 President: Levon Ter-Petrosyan
 Prime Minister: Gagik Harutyunyan (until 30 July), Khosrov Harutyunyan (starting 30 July)

Events

January
 January 27 - In the disputed territory of Nagorno-Karabakh, fighting between Armenians and Azeris leaves at least 60 people dead.
 January 28 - The current form of the Armenian Armed Forces is established.
 January 29 - A resolution without any vote is adopted for recommendation to the General Assembly that Armenia be admitted.

May
 May 8-9 - The Armenian Armed Forces capture the city of Shushi, marking the first significant military victory by Armenians.

June
 June 25 - Armenia joins the Organization of the Black Sea Economic Cooperation.

References

 
1990s in Armenia
Years of the 20th century in Armenia
Armenia
Armenia
Armenia